St. Mark's Episcopal Chapel is a small Gothic Revival chapel in Corinna Township, Minnesota, United States, built in 1871. It was listed on the National Register of Historic Places in 1979 for having local significance in the themes of architecture and religion.  It was nominated as a well-preserved example of a board and batten Gothic Revival parish church.

History
St. Mark's Episcopal Chapel was founded in 1871 by Octavius Longworth and the Reverend David Buel Knickerbacker, who had both been members of St. Mark's Church in Brooklyn, New York.  Longworth moved to Wright County, Minnesota, in 1859, while Knickerbacker had moved to Minneapolis in 1856 and become rector of Gethsemane Episcopal Church.  Knickerbacker occasionally visited Longworth's house to conduct services.  The two decided to establish a church in Wright County, so Longworth donated the land and built the structure.  Construction started in 1871 and finished the following year, at which time Bishop Henry Benjamin Whipple dedicated the building.  Fifteen years later Bishop Whipple returned to consecrate the building.

See also
 List of Anglican churches
 National Register of Historic Places listings in Wright County, Minnesota

References

19th-century Episcopal church buildings
1871 establishments in Minnesota
Buildings and structures in Wright County, Minnesota
Carpenter Gothic church buildings in Minnesota
Churches completed in 1871
Churches on the National Register of Historic Places in Minnesota
Episcopal chapels in the United States
Episcopal church buildings in Minnesota
National Register of Historic Places in Wright County, Minnesota